The 1930 Nevada gubernatorial election was held on November 4, 1930. Incumbent Republican Fred B. Balzar defeated Democratic nominee Charles L. Richards with 53.25% of the vote.

Primary elections
Primary elections were held on September 2, 1930.

Democratic primary

Candidates
Charles L. Richards, former U.S. Representative
Horace A. Agee

Results

Republican primary

Candidates
Fred B. Balzar, incumbent Governor
Edwin E. Roberts, Mayor of Reno
R. H. Cowles

Results

General election

Candidates
Fred B. Balzar, Republican 
Charles L. Richards, Democratic

Results

References

1930
Nevada